The Witcher is a six-issue comic books series, written by Maciej Parowski and illustrated by Bogusław Polch, mostly adapting Andrzej Sapkowski's early stories about The Witcher. The comics were the first attempt to portray the Witcher universe outside the novels. While initially the series received mixed reviews, it has become more popular later, and is accepted as an important milestone in the development of the Witcher's franchise, as well as setting the visual style of the universe.

Publishing history 
From 1993 to 1995, Andrzej Sapkowski's stories about The Witcher were adapted into six comic books by Maciej Parowski and Sapkowski (story) and Bogusław Polch (art).

The six albums are:
Droga bez powrotu (The Road with No Return) – Based on the short story "Droga, z której się nie wraca". Published in Komiks 8/93 (26), 1993.
Geralt – Based on the short story "Wiedźmin" ("The Witcher"). Published in Komiks  9/93 (27), 1993.
Mniejsze zło (The Lesser Evil) – Based on the short story with the same title. Published in Komiks  10/93 (28), 1993.
Ostatnie życzenie (The Last Wish) – Based on the short story with the same title. Published in Komiks 2/94 (30), 1994.
Granica możliwości (The Bounds of Reason) – Based on the short story with the same title. Published in Komiks 1/95 (31), 1995.
Zdrada (Betrayal) – Based on an "unused idea for a short story", consulted with and inspired by Sapkowski, this is the one and only original story (not based on previously published short stories). It features a young Geralt, and is set before most other works. Published in Komiks  2/95 (32), 1995.
The albums were later released in collected volumes, beginning with a two-part edition (each part collecting three albums) in 2001.

Reception 
At first, the comics gained only a lackluster following and mixed reviews; it would not be until the television and video game version of the 2000s that the Witcher franchise became more widely recognized. Some blamed it for the demise of the Komiks magazine, which ceased publication in 1995, after publishing the last volume of the Witcher series. Many readers were disappointed with the art, saying that the world and characters drawn by Polch were "not as they imagined it". Technical issue with print quality and divergences from the original plot of the short stories were also criticized. Some compared the series, usually unfavorably, with the previous, well-received original series from Polch and Parowski, Funky Koval.

However, in time, the series gained a "second life", and become more positively reviewed as a pioneering endeavour—being the first visual representation of the Witcher universe—which, "while flawed, had many successful episodes and ideas". Later critics noted that much of the earlier criticism of Polch's art style was unfair, as Sapkowski's description of characters, including of Geralt of Rivia himself, were generally vague, and Polch had the difficult task to use what sparse descriptions there were and then meet the visions of the world as vividly imagined by the book readers. Polch's visual portrayal of Geralt, while initially controversial, became the basis for latter representation of him and the world of the Witcher in other media.

Significance 
The comics were the first attempt to portray the Witcher universe outside the novels.

See also
The Witcher (Dark Horse Comics)

References 

Polish comics titles
1993 comics debuts
The Witcher
Comics based on novels
Fantasy comics